Altin Dodë Lala (born 18 November 1975) is an Albanian former professional footballer who played as a defensive midfielder and former manager. He spent his entire playing career in Germany and represented the Albania national football team.

He has also enjoyed a long international career, making 79 appearances for his country since 1998, the second highest in Albania's international history, being overtaken only by Lorik Cana in 2014. He debuted for Albania in  January 1998 during a friendly match and then participated in the friendly tournament 2000 Rothmans, helping his team to win the tournament. He participated in overall seven qualifying tournaments of both UEFA European Championship and FIFA World Cup. He also scored three goals for his country. His first international goal came in March 2003 in a UEFA Euro 2004 qualifying match against Russia. Lala took over the captaincy of Albania national team in 2007, ever since Igli Tare was no longer capped by former manager Otto Baric during the UEFA Euro 2008 qualifying. He led his team as a captain in the next qualifying tournaments of the 2010 FIFA World Cup and the UEFA Euro 2012 until 2011 before announcing his retirement from international football.

Early life
Lala was born in the capital of Albania, Tirana, to Dodë and Pashke Lala who are both originally from Pukë. He grew up in the Tirana e Re neighbourhood of the capital with his parents, brother and sister, where he played football on the streets like most of the children in the area. His father wanted him to focus on his education ahead of sport, but eventually did sign up Lala to local side Dinamo Tirana.

He travelled to Germany at the age of 15 with the Albanian U-16 side in 1991, where they were staying at their training camp near the Port of Hamburg. However, Lala along with many of his teammates decided against returning to Albania and instead he sought asylum in Germany. He eventually settled at a refugee camp in Fulda, where he joined local side Borussia Fulda's youth team. As he could not speak anything other than Albanian, he relied on hand signals to communicate with the players and coaches, but after two years in the youth team he was promoted to the senior side.

Club career

Borussia Fulda
After the first team of Borussia Fulda was promoted to the third tier Oberliga Hessen, he was often as an unused substitute during the second half of the 1993–94 season playing two matches. In the next season, the Oberliga Hessen was moved to the fourth tier of German football. Lala managed to play eight matches. He managed to establish himself in the first team for the 1995–96 season to play 24 games and to score his first and only goal in the whole season. Borussia Fulda reachted the first place in the table which meant promotion to the Regionalliga Süd in the next season.

Hannover 96
On 21 July 1998, he joined newly promoted 2. Bundesliga team Hannover 96; making his debut on 30 July 1998, in a 1–0 victory over Karlsruher SC. Here, he helped the club win the promotion to the Bundesliga in 2001–02 and since has played over 149 Bundesliga games, becoming the longest-serving player within their squad. In all his time at Hannover 96, Lala has only scored one Bundesliga goal.

In 2004, he became team captain and remained so until the 2007–08 season, being popular both within the team and with fans (who have nicknamed him "The Battle Dwarf" (German: Kampfzwerg) due to his combative style of play).

In the 2007–08 season, he made 28 league appearances without scoring a goal. Lala did not make a great start to the 2008–09 season, he only managed to start in five of the opening games and to come on as a substitute in some of the other games. Hannover 96 did not make a good start either as they only managed ten wins this season. After 181 Bundesliga matches for 96 his career in the German top-flight ended with the 2011–12 season.

Bayern Munich II
Despite planning his retirement once his contract with Hannover ran out in the summer of 2012, Bayern Munich II were in talks with Lala in March about joining the club on a free transfer in the summer. The idea was proposed by Lala's former teammate Michael Tarnat, a youth scout at Bayern Munich. Lala made three appearances for Bayern's reserve team before being forced to retire due to injury in October 2012.

International career
He recorded 79 appearances for Albania national team and is currently the second highest in Albania's international history, being overtaken only by Lorik Cana in 2014. He has also scored three goals for his country.

He debuted with Albania senior team under coach Astrit Hafizi on 21 January 1998 in a friendly against Turkey as a half-time substitute for Përparim Daiu; in Lala's presence on the pitch during the second-half, Albania managed to score three times to take an away 1–4 victory at İzmir Atatürk Stadium. Right after his debut he went on to participate in the 1998 Rothmans International Tournament in next month. He was ever-present in the whole tournament under coach Hafizi and Albania took two draws against hosts Malta (1–1) and Latvia (2–2) and lost to Georgia to end the tournament in the third place. He participated in the next edition in 2000, helping his team to win the tournament. He scored his first international goal on 29 March 2003 in a UEFA Euro 2004 qualifying match against Russia in the 79th minute; the match ended 3–1 for Albania and became one of the country's greatest ever achievements in football. His second goal came just three months later during the same qualifying tournament against Switzerland in the 22nd minute of a thrilling 3–2 loss. Lala became the captain of Albania during the UEFA Euro 2008 qualifying, since Igli Tare was no longer capped by former manager Otto Baric. His third and final goal was scored in his 50th match for the Red and Blacks against San Marino in 2006.

Managerial career
On 3 March 2014, Lala was presented as assistant coach of Albania national football team by head coach Gianni De Biasi, replacing previous assistant Angelo Pereni. On 12 August 2014, Lala was named as the Albania national under-19 football team coach, after the previous coach Foto Strakosha left to work for Olympiakos.

Career statistics

Club
Source:

International
Source:

International goals

|-
|1.
|29 March 2003
|Loro Boriçi Stadium, Shkodër, Albania
|
|2–1
|3–1
|rowspan="2"|UEFA Euro 2004 qualifying
|
|-
|-
|2.
|11 June 2003
|Stade de Genève, Geneva, Switzerland
|
|1–1
|2–3
|
|-
|3.
|16 August 2006
|Stadio Olimpico, Serravalle, San Marino
|
|3–0
|3–0
|Friendly
|
|}

Honours
Hannover 96
2. Bundesliga: 2001–02

References

External links

 
 
 

1975 births
Living people
Footballers from Tirana
Albanian footballers
20th-century Albanian sportspeople
21st-century Albanian sportspeople
Association football midfielders
Albania international footballers
FK Dinamo Tirana players
Borussia Fulda players
Hannover 96 players
FC Bayern Munich II players
Bundesliga players
2. Bundesliga players
Albanian expatriate footballers
Expatriate footballers in Germany
Albanian expatriate sportspeople in Germany
Albanian football managers
Albanian defectors